This is a list of articles that list different types or classifications of communication protocols used in computer networks.

See also
 List of network buses
 List of network scientists
 Outline of computing